The War Within is the fourth studio album by American heavy metal band Shadows Fall. The album has sold over 300,000 copies worldwide.  The War Within is the band's best selling album, and in 2005 made sales history on Century Media Records when it became the label's best selling album of all time. To date, the album retains this status. The album was also issued as a limited edition digipak with an exclusive bonus DVD that featured bootleg concert footage along with drum and guitar lessons from members of the band. The album debuted at number 20 on the Billboard 200 during its release.

Lyrical themes 
The following is a quote from Tom Bejgrowicz, who worked closely with Brian Fair on the overarching themes and concepts portrayed by the album. He also designed the album artwork.

The track "Those Who Cannot Speak" is dedicated to Brian Fair's autistic niece and nephew. Fair explained in an interview:

Critical reception 
The War Within received positive reception on its initial release. The album debuted at position no. 20 on the Billboard 200 — the band's highest charting album. Wade Kergan of Allmusic noted that the album had "more in common now with the classic thrash of Metallica than the metal-tinged hardcore of Coalesce." Michael Gluck of Lambgoat commented that the album "delivers itself with a fury and honoring of eighties metal guitar and vocal harmonies." In 2005, the album was ranked number 370 in Rock Hard magazine's book The 500 Greatest Rock & Metal Albums of All Time.

The song "What Drives the Weak" received a Grammy Award nomination for the 48th Annual Grammy Awards Best Metal Performance in 2006, however the award went to Slipknot for the song "Before I Forget." In a 2009 MetalSucks feature titled "21 Best Metal Albums of the 21st Century... So Far", the album was listed as number 20 based on poll data from professionals in the metal industry. The editors wrote, "The Art of Balance, their third album, was solid, but The War Within was where they really hit their stride. The dual guitars of Donais and Bachand spotlighted great solos and dual harmonies that could be appreciated by both Anthrax fans and pentatonic sweep enthusiasts."

Track listing

Personnel 

Shadows Fall
Brian Fair – lead vocals
Jon Donais – lead guitar, backing vocals
Matt Bachand – rhythm guitar, clean vocals
Paul Romanko – bass
Jason Bittner – drums
Production
Produced, engineered, and mixed by Zeuss and Shadows Fall
Digital editing by Rob Gil
Mastered by Alan Douches
Cover art, art direction, design, and layout by Tom Bejgrowicz
Photography and digital manipulation by Justin Borucki
"SF" logo by Don Naylor
Themes and concepts by Brian Fair and Tom Bejgrowicz

Admiral Anger and the Gang Bang BBQ Crew – backing vocals

Produced by Zach Merck
DVD compilation by Rob Avery
"Stepping Outside the Circle" bootleg fan footage compiled and edited by Zach Merck
"Of One Blood" and "A Fire in Babylon" bootleg video produced by Denise Korycki
Guitar lessons by Nick Bowcott, produced by Guitar World
Drum lesson filmed by Mike Maney and Derek Bittner, produced and edited by Mike Maney, executive produced by Jason Bittner

Song usage 
The song "What Drives the Weak" was used as a track on the Projekt Revolution sampler CD given to members of the Linkin Park Underground. It is also featured on MTV2 Headbangers Ball Volume 2.
The cover "Teasn' Pleasn'" by Dangerous Toys on the Japanese edition of the album was subsequently released on the compilation album Fallout from the War.
"The Light That Blinds" is featured as a bonus track on Guitar Hero II.
"What Drives the Weak" and "The Power of I and I" are featured on the Final Fight: Streetwise soundtrack.
"The Power of I and I" is featured on the UFC Ultimate Beatdowns Vol. 1 compilation CD.

Chart positions 

Album

Singles

References 

Shadows Fall albums
2004 albums
Century Media Records albums
Albums produced by Chris "Zeuss" Harris